Salomon Coster (c. 1620–1659) was a Dutch clockmaker of the Hague, who in 1657 was the first to make a pendulum clock, which had been invented by Christiaan Huygens (1629-1695). Coster died a sudden death in 1659.

Coster's earliest pendulum clocks were signed "Samuel Coster - Haghe met privilege", indicating that he had been authorized by the inventor (Huygens) to make such clocks.  This clock design was heralded as a new beginning in the clockmaking industry, due to its level of timekeeping accuracy which was previously unheard of. The oldest extant pendulum clock, signed by Coster in 1657, is on display at the Boerhaave Museum in Leiden, the Netherlands. 

Around the same time, John Fromanteel, the son of a London clockmaker named Ahasuerus, went to work for Coster. He was one of many foreign clockmakers to soon make pendulum clocks following the prototype by Huygens and Coster. A contract was signed on 3 September 1657 between Salomon Coster and John Fromanteel which allowed Fromanteel to continue making the clocks.

References 

 
 
 
 R. Memel en V. Kersing: Salomon Coster, de Haagse periode; het Tijdschrift 2014-4 en 2015-1

External links
ScienceMuseum.org.uk
Antique-horlogy.org
Formanteel.com

1620s births
1659 deaths
Dutch scientific instrument makers
Dutch clockmakers
Place of birth missing
Christiaan Huygens